The Tie That Binds is a 1923 American silent drama film directed by Joseph Levering and starring Walter Miller, Barbara Bedford, Raymond Hatton, William P. Carleton, and Robert Edeson. It is based on a novel of the same name by Frank R. Adams. The film was released by Warner Bros. on March 15, 1923.

Cast
Walter Miller as David Winthrop
Barbara Bedford as Mary Ellen Gray
Raymond Hatton as Hiram Foster
William P. Carleton as Daniel Kenyon
Robert Edeson as Charles Dodge
Julia Swayne Gordon as Leila Brant
Marian Swayne as Flora Foster
Effie Shannon as Mrs. Mills

Preservation
The film is now considered lost.

References

External links

1923 drama films
Silent American drama films
1923 films
American silent feature films
American black-and-white films
Lost American films
Films directed by Joseph Levering
1923 lost films
Lost drama films
1920s American films